Erleks is a rural locality (a selo) in Posyolok Urshelsky, Gus-Khrustalny District, Vladimir Oblast, Russia. The population was 10 as of 2010.

Geography 
Erleks is located on the right bank of the Pol River, 22 km west of Gus-Khrustalny (the district's administrative centre) by road. Trufanovo is the nearest rural locality.

References 

Rural localities in Gus-Khrustalny District